The Chinese New Version (abbreviation:CNV) is a Chinese language Bible translation that was completed in 1992 by the Worldwide Bible Society (環球聖經公會 Huanqiu Shengjing Xiehui)  with the assistance of the Lockman Foundation. It was formerly known as the "New Chinese Version" (NCV), but the English name and abbreviation was changed to avoid confusion with the English New Century Version.

Text

Editions
It is available in Hong Kong in both the traditional Chinese script and the simplified Chinese used in mainland China - although the version is not approved for use in China by the Three Self Patriotic Movement. The most popular Chinese Bible in mainland China remains the older Chinese Union Version, and secondly the legally produced Today's Chinese Version.  The Three Self Church discourages use of the Chinese New Version and other unlicensed versions, but in Taiwan and Hong Kong the CNV has found a following especially in evangelical circles.

The Sword Project and Olive Tree Bible Software both have modules for both the New Chinese Version and the Union Version of the Bible. More recently (as of January 2014) these bibles were made available for parallel searching at BibleHunter.com & Holy-Bibles.net .

See also
 Chinese Bible Translations

References

External links
wwbibleus.org 

1992 books
New Version
1992 in Christianity